Kevin Belcher may refer to:

 Kevin Belcher (baseball) (born 1967), American baseball player
 Kevin Belcher (center) (1961–2003), American football player
 Kevin Belcher (offensive tackle) (1961–1997), American football player